The Kellys of Tobruk was a comedy feature film directed by Rupert Kathner which was meant to be released in 1942. Advertisements were placed in newspapers in January 1942 claiming pupils at their acting school could get roles in the movie. The film appears to have been abandoned after Kathner's company, Fanfare, was taken over by Supreme Sound System.

Kathner and his partner Alma Brooks were later charged with conspiracy to defraud by investors in Fanfare Films, but were acquitted.

References

1940s unfinished films
Australian comedy films